Coalmont is a borough in Huntingdon County, Pennsylvania, United States. The population was 91 at the 2020 census.

Geography
Coalmont is located near the southwestern border of Huntingdon County at  (40.210551, -78.200946), in the valley of Shoup Run, a tributary of the Raystown Branch Juniata River. Pennsylvania Route 913 passes through the center of the borough, leading east (upstream)  to Dudley and west (downstream)  to Saxton.

Demographics

As of the census of 2000, there were 128 people, 50 households, and 37 families residing in the borough. The population density was 1,108.2 people per square mile (411.8/km2). There were 55 housing units at an average density of 476.2 per square mile (177.0/km2). The racial makeup of the borough was 100.00% White.

There were 50 households, out of which 42.0% had children under the age of 18 living with them, 64.0% were married couples living together, 2.0% had a female householder with no husband present, and 26.0% were non-families. 26.0% of all households were made up of individuals, and 18.0% had someone living alone who was 65 years of age or older. The average household size was 2.56 and the average family size was 3.08.

In the borough the population was spread out, with 28.9% under the age of 18, 1.6% from 18 to 24, 36.7% from 25 to 44, 21.1% from 45 to 64, and 11.7% who were 65 years of age or older. The median age was 35 years. For every 100 females there were 93.9 males. For every 100 females age 18 and over, there were 106.8 males.

The median income for a household in the borough was $38,750, and the median income for a family was $52,917. Males had a median income of $30,625 versus $28,750 for females. The per capita income for the borough was $15,260. There were 5.1% of families and 7.6% of the population living below the poverty line, including 11.4% of under eighteens and none of those over 64.

References

Populated places established in 1864
Boroughs in Huntingdon County, Pennsylvania